Henri Fiori (20 February 1881, Algiers - 14 January 1963) was a French politician. He represented the Republican-Socialist Party (from 1919 to 1936) and the Socialist Republican Union (from 1936 to 1940) in the Chamber of Deputies.

References

1881 births
1963 deaths
People from Algiers
People of French Algeria
Pieds-Noirs
Republican-Socialist Party politicians
Socialist Republican Union politicians
Members of the 12th Chamber of Deputies of the French Third Republic
Members of the 13th Chamber of Deputies of the French Third Republic
Members of the 15th Chamber of Deputies of the French Third Republic
Members of the 16th Chamber of Deputies of the French Third Republic
Migrants from French Algeria to France